The prickly anglerfish (Himantolophus appelii) is a footballfish of the family Himantolophidae, found around the world in the southern oceans (apart from eastern Pacific), in deep water.  Its length is up to 40 cm (16 in).  It is a mesopelagic species.

A specimen was collected on November 14, 2007.

It was first described in 1878 by Frank Edward Clarke as Aegoeonichthys appelii. The species epithet honours Mr Appel who provided F. E. Clarke with a specimen.

References

 

Himantolophidae
Deep sea fish
Fish described in 1878
Taxa named by Frank Edward Clarke